Wheaton Township may refer to:
 Wheaton Township, Barry County, Missouri
 Wheaton Township, Bottineau County, North Dakota

See also 
 Wheaton (disambiguation)